David Marlin Dooley (born 13 May 1952) is an American chemist with expertise in organometallic compounds, and university administrator who has served as Provost of Montana State University and the eleventh President of the University of Rhode Island.

Early life and education
Dooley was born May 13, 1952, in Tulare County, California, to Walter Marvin Dooley and Mary Frances (Leonard) Dooley.  He attended Foothill Aurora High School in Bakersfield, California, and he married Lynn Erville Baker, an ordained Baptist Minister, on Nov. 24, 1978 in Nobles County, Minnesota. He earned his bachelor's degree in 1974 at the University of California, San Diego and his Ph.D. degree in 1979 at California Institute of Technology in Pasadena, California.

Academic career
Dooley's first academic appointment was as an instructor of chemistry at Amherst College in 1978, where he remained until 1993 when he assumed his position as head of the Department of Chemistry and Biochemistry at Montana State University.  Between 1984 and 1993, Dooley held a joint appointment as a chemistry professor at the University of Massachusetts, Amherst, where he conducted much of his research into organometallic chemistry. In 1993, he joined the faculty of Montana State University as the chairperson of the Department of Chemistry and Biochemistry.  In 1999, he was appointed as interim provost, and in 2001, he was named as the permanent provost. In 2009, he joined the University of Rhode Island as its eleventh president and primarily focused on enhancing the global reach of the university and its research programs. Throughout his career as an administrator at both MSU and URI, he maintained his research program as an active scientist.

Legacy
Upon the Dooley's retirement from the University of Rhode Island, the University of Rhode Island Board of Trustees approved naming of the President David M. Dooley Science Quadrangle in his honor.

Selected works
 Solomon, E.I., J.W. Hare, D.M. Dooley, J.H. Dawson, P.J. Stephens, and H.B. Gray. 1980. Spectroscopic Studies of Stellacyanin, Plastocyanin, and Azurin, Electronic structure of Blue Copper Sites. Journal of the American Chemical Society 102(1):168-178.
 Dooley, D.M., M.A. McGuirl, D.E. Brown, P.N. Turowski, W.S. McIntire, and P.F. Knowles. 1991. A Cu(I)-semiquinone state in substrate-reduced amine oxidases. Nature 349:262-264. https://www.nature.com/articles/349262a0
 Wang, S.X, M. Mure, K.F. Medzihradszky, A.L. Burlingame, D.E. Brown, D.M. Dooley, A.J. Smith, H.M. Kagan, and J.P. Klinman. 1996. A Crosslinked Cofactor in Lysyl Oxidase: Redox Function for Amino Acid Side Chains. Science 273 (5278):1078-1084. DOI: 10.1126/science.273.5278.1078
Kumar, V., D.M. Dooley, H.C. Freeman, J.M. Guss, I. Harvey, M.A. McGuirl, M.C.J. White, and V.M. Zuback. 1996. Crystal structure of a eukaryotic (pea seedling) copper-containing amine oxidase at 2.2 å resolution. Structure 4(8):943-955. https://doi.org/10.1016/S0969-2126(96)00101-3
 Wilce, M.C.J., D.M. Dooley, H.C. Freeman, J.M. Guss, H. Matsunami, W.S. McIntire, C.E. Ruggiero, K. Tanizawa, and H. Yamaguchi. 1997. Biochemistry 36(51):16116-16333. https://doi.org/10.1021/bi971797i
 Rasmussen, T., B.C. Berks, J. Sanders-Loer, D.M. Dooley, W.G. Zumft, and A.J. Thompson. 2000. The Catalytic Center in Nitrous Oxide Reductase, Cu-z, Is a Copper−Sulfide Cluster. Biochemistry 39(42):12753-12756.
 Zhu, H., Xie, G., Liu, M., J.S. Olson, M. Fabian, D.M. Dooley, B. Lei. 2008. Pathway for Heme Uptake from Human Methemoglobin by the Iron-regulated Surface Determinants System of Staphylococcus aureus. Journal of Biological Chemistry 283(26):18450-18460. https://doi.org/10.1074/jbc.M801466200
 Adelson, C.N., E.M. Johnston, K.M. Hilmer, H. Watts, S.G. Dey, D.E. Brown, J.B. Broderick, D.M. Dooley, and E.I. Solomon. 2019. Characterization of the Preprocessed Copper Site Equilibrium in Amine Oxidase and Assignment of the Reactive Copper Site in Topaquinone Biogenesis. Journal of the American Chemical Society 141(22):8877-8890.  https://doi.org/10.1021/jacs.9b01922
 Lim, H., M.L. Baker, R.E. Crowley, S. Kim, M. Bahadra, M.A. Siegler, T. Kroll, D. Sokaras, T-C. Weng, D.R. Biswas, D.M. Dooley, K.D. Karlin, B. Hedman, K.O. Hodgson, and E.I. Solomon. 2020. Kβ X-ray Emission Spectroscopy as a Probe of Cu(I) Sites: Application to the Cu(I) Site in Preprocessed Galactose Oxidase. Inorganic Chemistry 59(22):16567-16581. https://doi.org/10.1021/acs.inorgchem.0c02495

References

External links
  University of Rhode Island Historical Timeline

1952 births
American chemists
Amherst College faculty
University of Massachusetts Amherst faculty
University of Rhode Island faculty
Montana State University faculty
Presidents of the University of Rhode Island
Scientists from California
Living people